Vålerbanen is a race track located in the village of Braskereidfoss in Våler Municipality in Innlandet county, Norway. It is a part of Norsk Trafikksenter and is also used for driving practice by driver's license students, in particular driving under special conditions such as on icy roads. Among the more popular events hosted at Vålerbanen are the annual Gatebil event and Norway's largest amateur racing event and sports car display, Classic & Sportscar Meeting. On 14 September 2008, the track hosted the tenth race of the 2008 Swedish Touring Car Championship season.

Although not as technically demanding as Rudskogen, it is significantly faster and allows better for overtaking.

For the 2008 season, a newly built  track section was added. Although not usable for racing, it is regularly used for trackday meets and driving practice.

Facilities
  circular track
  off-road track for four-wheeled vehicles
  outdoor go-kart track
 3 skidpans (straight line, curve and downhill)

Lap records

The official race lap records at the Vålerbanen are listed as:

References

External links
 Vålerbanen official website
 Norsk Trafikksenter official website

Motorsport venues in Norway
Våler, Innlandet